A facelift is the revival of a product through cosmetic means, for example by changing its appearance while leaving its underlying engineering or design intact.

Web sites, magazines or other industries may also be facelifted, for instance when their titles and products appear dated.

The term probably comes from the same term used in plastic surgery.

Purpose 
It is commonly applied to many kinds of products to keep them competitive during a model's product life cycle and to increasing the sales revenue of products. To earn high sales revenue and profits for as long as possible with one product generation, one must enhance the product's attractiveness from time to time.

In automotive industry, the product lifecycle of mass-produced productions  is always 4 to 6 years, and during that period, the competitor company will introduce new product to hold more market share. When new cars have launched into the market for 2 and 3 years, to keep their strength in the market, company will push out a facelift version to attract new and past customers to change their cars as they observe the sales revenue starts decreasing. This process is controlled by product life cycle management.

Manifestation in Automobiles 

In automobiles industry, facelift often be shown as a small change in its outlook, updating its engine output, adding some new equipment or creating a new edition etc.

In the case of the Mercedes-Benz E-Class (W212), the facelift introduced in 2013 for model year 2014 introduced a lot of significant changes. On the exterior, the are new bumpers with redesigned lower air intakes, slightly revised rear lights with LED technology as well as new grille design for the Avantgarde models. In addition, new single-piece LED headlights with integrated daytime running light was introduced, replacing the two-piece Bi-Xenon headlights with separate DRL on the lower air intakes on the pre-facelift models. On the interior, however, changes are limited to a new gauge cluster, an update to the COMAND system and a new steering wheel design. Mechanically, the updated M 274 engines replaced the previous M 271 units on 4-cylinder petrol models, a new E400 model with a 329hp 3.0L (later increased to 3.5L) twin-turbo V6 petrol engine was introduced, and a new 9-speed automatic transmission was introduced on V6 diesel models, replacing the previous 7-speed transmission.

Sugar Water Gets a Facelift 
A good facelift can bring an increasing revenue and a better reputation to the company.

In 2008, Coke, Pepsi Bottles try new sizes to pump up sales. While U.S. soda sales in major retail channels overall declined 3.5% in the first quarter, convenience-store sales dropped 4.2%, according to Beverage Digest, an industry publication. The 20-ounce bottle accounts for most convenience-store soda sales. To win back sales, several Coca-Cola and Pepsi bottlers are conducting pilot tests on a variety of bottle sizes they hope will appeal to consumers put off by the 20-ounce bottle or looking for a cheaper option to cushion the blow of high food and energy prices.

Facelifts of websites 

Facelifts of websites may take the form of changes in the appearance of the web, a new function being added, etc.

For example, to improve the GMB website, a new navigation panel was built to helps users get less confused when navigating around in the dashboard.

Also, in response to the increasingly mobile nature of web usage, Facebook rolled out key updates to make Pages more mobile-friendly and user-friendly. To make Pages more mobile-friendly, Facebook has changed the layout to include tabs for each Page section – allowing a visitor to get the information they need in a streamlined fashion, while eliminating cumbersome scrolling and clicking.

When a website is not able to give the result people want, do not meet the modern functionality standards, and is not responsive and mobile-friendly, then it may need a facelift to improve the situation.

References

Product management

pl:Facelifting (motoryzacja)